Michael Boris (born 3 June 1975) is a German professional football manager and former player.

Playing career 
As a player he played in lower class German clubs: Wattenscheid II, Hessen Kassel, VfB Speldorf and Kickers Emden.

Managerial career 
He began his coaching career at Kickers Emden in 2004, where he was an assistant coach for three years.  After several teams in the lower classes he became the coach of Uerdingen, where he managed the team in 19 matches and won 11 of it.

In August 2016 he was appointed as the federal coach of the Hungarian U19 national team. His first match in Telki was against the Slovenian national team, and in the second half, György Kamarás scored the only goal of the match. For the first time, the U21 team was led by him at a qualifier against Liechtenstein. For two and a half years, he worked for the MLSZ, and in January 2019 he became assistant coach in Japan for the second-class Tokyo Verdy team. On 30 May 2019, he was appointed as the head coach of the Hungarian second-class team MTK.

In June 2021 Boris was named new manager of Danish Superliga club SønderjyskE. Following a poor start to the season he was sacked on 1 November 2021.

On 15 February 2022, he was announced as the new manager of Hungarian team Fehérvár FC.

Honours 
Sportfreunde Siegen
 NRW-Liga runner up: 2011–12

References

External links 

Profile at kicker.de 

1975 births
Living people
German footballers
Association football goalkeepers
German football managers
KSV Hessen Kassel players
Kickers Emden players
Kickers Emden managers
Sportfreunde Siegen managers
Sportfreunde Lotte managers
KFC Uerdingen 05 managers
MTK Budapest FC managers
SønderjyskE Fodbold managers
German expatriate football managers
German expatriate sportspeople in Hungary
German expatriate sportspeople in Japan
German expatriate sportspeople in Denmark
Expatriate football managers in Hungary
Expatriate football managers in Japan
Expatriate football managers in Denmark
Nemzeti Bajnokság I managers
Danish Superliga managers
Fehérvár FC managers